This is a list of numbered roads in Haldimand County, Ontario. There are two classes of numbered roads in Haldimand County: regional roads, former King's Highways downloaded to county responsibility in the late 1990s, and county roads, analogous to the county roads of other counties.

County Roads

Regional Roads
 

Haldimand